The Netherlands participated in the Eurovision Song Contest 2018 with the song "Outlaw in 'Em" written by Waylon, Ilya Toshinsky and Jim Beavers. The song is performed by Waylon, who was internally selected by the Dutch broadcaster AVROTROS to represent the Netherlands at the 2018 contest in Lisbon, Portugal. Waylon's appointment as the Dutch representative was announced on 9 November 2017. Five potential songs were presented to the public between 23 February and 1 March 2018 during the Dutch talk show De Wereld Draait Door, and the selected song, "Outlaw in 'Em", was announced on 2 March 2018.

The Netherlands was drawn to compete in the second semi-final of the Eurovision Song Contest, which took place on 10 May 2018. The song "Outlaw in 'Em" was the 8th song to be played in the contest. The song was placed in the Top Ten entries for the semi-finals and thus qualified to compete in the finals on the 12 May. Of the 18 participating countries in the semi-final, the Netherlands placed 7th with a total of 174 points. In the subsequent final, the Netherlands placed 18th out of the 26 participating countries, with a total score of 121 points.

Background
Following the introduction of semi-finals for the 2004 contest, the Netherlands had featured in only five finals. The Dutch least successful result has been last place, which they have achieved on five occasions, most recently in the second semi-final of the 2011 contest.

The Dutch national broadcaster, AVROTROS, broadcasts the event within the Netherlands and organises the selection process for the nation's entry. The Netherlands has used various methods to select the Dutch entry in the past, such as the Nationaal Songfestival, a live televised national final to choose the performer, song or both to compete at Eurovision. However, internal selections have also been held on occasion. Since 2013, the broadcaster has internally selected the Dutch entry for the contest. In 2013, the internal selection of Anouk performing "Birds" managed to take the country to the final for the first time in eight years and placed ninth overall. In 2014, the internal selection of the Common Linnets performing "Calm After the Storm" qualified the nation to the final once again and placed second, making it the most successful Dutch result in the contest since their victory in 1975. For 2018, the broadcaster opted to continue selecting the Dutch entry through an internal selection.

Before Eurovision

Internal selection 

Following O'G3NE's eleventh place in the final in 2017 with the song "Lights and Shadows", the Dutch broadcaster revealed in October 2017 that they would continue to internally select both the artist and song for the Eurovision Song Contest, and that an announcement would be expected in November 2017 after several artists had already been in contact with the broadcaster in regards to participating. Artists that were rumoured in Dutch media to be in talks with AVROTROS included singers Alain Clark and Sharon den Adel as well as the winner of the sixth series of the reality singing competition The Voice of Holland Maan. On 9 November 2017, AVROTROS announced that they had selected singer Waylon to represent the Netherlands at the 2018 contest. Waylon had previously represented the Netherlands at the Eurovision Song Contest 2014 alongside Ilse DeLange as the Common Linnets, placing second with the song "Calm After the Storm". The selection of Waylon as the Dutch representative occurred through the decision of a selection commission consisting of singer and television host Jan Smit, television host and author Cornald Maas, radio DJ Daniël Dekker and AVROTROS general director Eric van Stade.

On 31 January 2018, Waylon revealed during an interview on the Dutch talk show De Wereld Draait Door that his Eurovision song had been selected from his upcoming album The World Can Wait, five of them which he performed during the show between 23 February and 1 March 2018. On 2 March 2018, "Outlaw in 'Em" was announced as Waylon's Eurovision entry. Prior to the announcement of the selected song, a poll by De Telegraaf revealed that 41% of the voters wanted Waylon to perform "Thanks But No Thanks" at the contest.

Promotion 
In the lead up to the Eurovision Song Contest, Waylon's promotional activities occurred entirely within the Netherlands where he performed at live events, radio shows and talk shows. On 14 April, Waylon performed during the Eurovision in Concert event which was held at the AFAS Live venue in Amsterdam and hosted by Edsilia Rombley and Cornald Maas.

At Eurovision 

According to Eurovision rules, all nations with the exceptions of the host country and the "Big Five" (France, Germany, Italy, Spain and the United Kingdom) are required to qualify from one of two semi-finals in order to compete for the final; the top ten countries from each semi-final progress to the final. The European Broadcasting Union (EBU) split up the competing countries into six different pots based on voting patterns from previous contests, with countries with favourable voting histories put into the same pot. On 29 January 2018, a special allocation draw was held which placed each country into one of the two semi-finals, as well as which half of the show they would perform in. The Netherlands was placed into the second semi-final, to be held on 10 May 2018, and was scheduled to perform in the first half of the show.

Once all the competing songs for the 2018 contest had been released, the running order for the semi-finals was decided by the shows' producers rather than through another draw, so that similar songs were not placed next to each other. The Netherlands was set to perform in position 8, following the entry from Moldova and preceding the entry from Australia.

The two semi-finals and the final was broadcast in the Netherlands on NPO 1 with commentary by Cornald Maas and Jan Smit. The Dutch spokesperson, who announced the top 12-point score awarded by the Dutch jury during the final, was 2017 Dutch Eurovision entrant O'G3NE.

Semi-final

Waylon took part in technical rehearsals on 1 and 5 May, followed by dress rehearsals on 9 and 10 May. This included the jury show on 9 May where the professional juries of each country watched and voted on the competing entries.

The Dutch performance featured Waylon wearing a black cowboy hat and cheetah print jacket and performing at a microphone stand on a podium together with four dancers. Waylon and three of the dancers also played a guitar in the beginning with one of them on drums, and one of the dancers . The four dancers that joined Waylon were Brandon Likiyo, Pierre Anganda, Pieter Likiyo and Roger Makadi, while an off-stage backing vocalists was also featured: Justin Pieplenbosch. The staging director for the performance was Hans Pannecoucke, who worked with the Dutch entrants between 2014 and 2016 in a similar role.

It was later revealed that Netherlands had placed seventh in the second semi-final, receiving a total of 174 points, 47 points from the televoting and 127 points from the juries.

Final 
Shortly after the second semi-final, a winners' press conference was held for the ten qualifying countries. As part of this press conference, the qualifying artists took part in a draw to determine which half of the grand final they would subsequently participate in. This draw was done in the order the countries were announced during the semi-final. The Netherlands was drawn to compete in the second half. Following this draw, the shows' producers decided upon the running order of the final, as they had done for the semi-finals. The Netherlands was subsequently placed to perform in position 23, following the entry from Israel and before the entry from Ireland.

Waylon once again took part in dress rehearsals on 11 and 12 May before the final, including the jury final where the professional juries cast their final votes before the live show. Waylon performed a repeat of his semi-final performance during the final on 12 May. The Netherlands placed eighteenth in the final, scoring 121 points: 32 points from the televoting and 89 points from the juries.

Voting
Voting during the three shows involved each country awarding two sets of points from 1-8, 10 and 12: one from their professional jury and the other from televoting. Each nation's jury consisted of five music industry professionals who are citizens of the country they represent, with their names published before the contest to ensure transparency. This jury judged each entry based on: vocal capacity; the stage performance; the song's composition and originality; and the overall impression by the act. In addition, no member of a national jury was permitted to be related in any way to any of the competing acts in such a way that they cannot vote impartially and independently. The individual rankings of each jury member as well as the nation's televoting results were released shortly after the grand final.

Below is a breakdown of points awarded to the Netherlands and awarded by the Netherlands in the second semi-final and grand final of the contest, and the breakdown of the jury voting and televoting conducted during the two shows:

Points awarded to the Netherlands

Points awarded by the Netherlands

Detailed voting results
The following members comprised the Dutch jury:
 Sharon den Adel (jury chairperson)singer
 Arno Krabmanproducer, songwriter
 Robert Estermusic and content director
 Rick Volcomposer, writer, manager
 Lesley van der Aasinger

References

External links

 Official AVROTROS Eurovision site

2018
Countries in the Eurovision Song Contest 2018
Eurovision